Thursday Night at the Village Vanguard is a live album by saxophonist Art Pepper, recorded at the Village Vanguard in 1977 and released on the Contemporary label.

Reception

The AllMusic review by Scott Yanow states: "Art Pepper's appearances at the Village Vanguard in 1977 were a major success, making the brilliance of the West Coast-based altoist obvious to the New York critics... the music is consistently stimulating and emotional".

Track listing
All compositions by Art Pepper except as indicated
 "Valse Triste" - 11:15
 "Goodbye" (Gordon Jenkins) - 11:49
 "Blues for Les" - 11:45
 "My Friend John" - 9:21
 "Blues For Heard" - 12:03 - CD Bonus Track

Personnel
Art Pepper - alto saxophone
George Cables - piano
George Mraz - bass
Elvin Jones - drums

References

Contemporary Records live albums
Art Pepper live albums
1979 live albums
Albums recorded at the Village Vanguard